Dragoljub "Doug" Utješenović (born 8 October 1946) is a former Serbian-Australian soccer player who played as a defender. He was a member of the Australian 1974 FIFA World Cup squad in West Germany. He went on to make 61 appearances for the team between 1972 and 1976, scoring two goals, as well as representing both New South Wales and Victoria.

Utješenović played his club football in both Yugoslavia and Australia, playing for OFK Beograd, Footscray JUST, St George Saints and Hong Kong First Division side Kui Tan, before coaching APIA-Leichhardt in 1988, Parramatta Eagles 1997 and 1998, and Bonnyrigg White Eagles 2000 to 2001.

References

External links 
 Career Record at OzFootball
 

1946 births
Living people
Footballers from Belgrade
Serbian emigrants to Australia
Australian people of Serbian descent
Australian soccer players
Australia international soccer players
1974 FIFA World Cup players
National Soccer League (Australia) players
Footscray JUST players
OFK Beograd players
Bonnyrigg White Eagles FC managers
Parramatta FC managers
Yugoslav emigrants to Australia
Expatriate footballers in Hong Kong
Association football defenders
Australian soccer coaches